Abraxaphantes is a monotypic moth genus in the family Geometridae described by Warren in 1890. Its only species, Abraxaphantes perampla, was first described by Swinhoe in 1890.(Swinhoe, 1890) It is found in Myanmar. & Thailand.

References

Oenochrominae
Geometridae genera